DZXQ (1350 AM), on-air as Radyo La Verdad 1350, is a radio station owned by Information Broadcast Unlimited and operated by Breakthrough and Milestones Productions International. Its studio and offices are located at La Verdad Christian College (LVCC) in Caloocan, while its transmitter is located along Kagitingan St., Brgy. Muzon, Malabon.

History

1973-2011: DZXQ
The station was established in 1973 under the ownership of Mabuhay Broadcasting System. During the martial law era, DZXQ was as a music station, competing with top-rater DWBL. Notable personalities of the station were Divine Pascual and Bobby Ante.

In 1986, DZXQ reformatted into a talk station, offering brokered programming, and carried the slogan "Kaibigan ng Masa". In the early 1990s, it moved to The Centerpoint Building in Ortigas Center, Pasig. Since then, it was the home of the Powerhouse Broadcasters such as Nar Pineda, Roger Arienda (who was once one of the anchors of DZMM), Rolly Canon, Narissa Gonzalez, Ducky Paredes, Jhino Parrucho, Ruben Ilagan, Popo Villanueva, Roland Lumagbas, Dr. Erick San Juan, Reggie Vizmanos and Roy Señeres. It was also the home of "An Affair with Baby Tsina", a lifestyle radio show. It aired Chinese Programming from 9pm - 12mn.

On March 6, 2011, DZXQ went off the air a few days after it is acquired by a new set of investors, whose immediate plans are to close only for six months. The affected broadcasters were informed that the station had been sold. Nar Pineda and the Powerhouse Broadcasters were forced to move to DWSS, while some moved to DWBL.

2011-present: UNTV Radio

It was later found out that these new investors are related to Information Broadcast Unlimited and UNTV. Breakthrough and Milestones Productions International took over the station's operations. In November 2011, the station returned on air as a simulcast of UNTV. Other timeslots were mostly filled by religious content provided by Ang Dating Daan. It also moved to its current home in UNTV Building.

On January 16, 2012, the station was formally launched as UNTV Radio La Verdad (Spanish word for "the truth radio"). Its mission is to bring back the glory of radio, from the current trend which is radio sans images or “Radio on TV” (TeleRadyo). UNTV Radio also introduced a mobile radio booth, a first in Philippine Radio history, where it broadcast from a specific location via see thru mobile studio vehicle.

In 2017, UNTV Radio was rebranded to Radyo La Verdad with a new logo and slogan "Totoong Balita, Tunay na Kalinga Para sa Kapwa". At the same year, it upgraded its transmitter facilities, which includes its transmitter house and a concrete catwalk, and replaced its four-decade old analog tube-type 10-kW transmitter with its brand new 50 kW solid-state radio transmitter.

In 2016, UNTV Radio conducted its first Student Reporters' Convention  held in Apalit, Pampanga. Currently, the radio station has Student Reporters across the country and abroad known as "La Verdad Correspondents".

Notable Anchors
 Kuya Daniel Razon (UNTV-BMPI President CEO) 
 Manolo Favis (formerly from DZBB)
 Bro. Eli Soriano

See also
UNTV News & Rescue
Ang Dating Daan

References

External links
Official Website
Old Website

Radio stations in Metro Manila
News and talk radio stations in the Philippines
Members Church of God International
Radio stations established in 1973